Katika is a village on the Huon Peninsula, in Siki ward of Kotte Rural LLG, Morobe Province, Papua New Guinea.

References

External links
http://www.fallingrain.com/world/PP/14/Katika.html

Populated places in Morobe Province